Octomeria rodeiensis is a species of orchid endemic to southeastern Brazil and Ecuador.

References

External links 

rodeiensis
Orchids of Brazil
Orchids of Ecuador